The 2010 NAB Cup was the Australian Football League (AFL) pre-season competition that was played before the 2010 season. It was the last pre-season competition held in the current knockout format due to the entry of the Gold Coast Suns into the AFL in 2011.

Games

Round 1

Round 2

Round 3

Grand final

Summary of results

NAB Challenge

See also
2010 AFL season

References

External links
NAB Cup 2010 fixtures revealed
NAB Cup opening fixture now to be played in Perth
Image collection

NAB Cup
Australian Football League pre-season competition